The canton of Talmont-Saint-Hilaire is an administrative division of the Vendée department, western France. Its borders were modified at the French canton reorganisation which came into effect in March 2015. Its seat is in Talmont-Saint-Hilaire.

It consists of the following communes:
 
Les Achards
Avrillé
Beaulieu-sous-la-Roche
Le Bernard
La Chapelle-Hermier
Le Girouard
Grosbreuil
L'Île-d'Olonne
Jard-sur-Mer
Longeville-sur-Mer
Martinet
Nieul-le-Dolent
Poiroux
Sainte-Flaive-des-Loups
Sainte-Foy
Saint-Georges-de-Pointindoux
Saint-Hilaire-la-Forêt
Saint-Julien-des-Landes
Saint-Mathurin
Saint-Vincent-sur-Jard
Talmont-Saint-Hilaire
Vairé

References

Cantons of Vendée